Drosera gibsonii is a species of pygmy sundew endemic to Stirling Range National Park in Western Australia. It is thought to be most closely related to Drosera silvicola.

References

Carnivorous plants of Australia
gibsonii
Eudicots of Western Australia
Caryophyllales of Australia